Petra Maganai Vitra Annai is 1958 Indian Tamil-language film, directed by V. Ramanathan and produced by Modern Theatres. The film stars S. S. Rajendran, R. S. Manohar, A. Karunanidhi and E. R. Sahadevan, with C. R. Vijayakumari, Pandari Bai and T. P. Muthulakshmi in supporting roles.

Plot

Cast 
 S. S. Rajendran as Prince Villalan/Neelan
 R. S. Manohar as Minister Gunasekaran
 C. R. Vijayakumari as Jeeva
 Pandari Bai as The Queen (Prince Villalan's mother)
 A. Karunanidhi as Duttan (Villalan's friend)
 T. P. Muthulakshmi as Mohana (Jeeva's friend)
 Kumari Rajamani as Nirmala (Gunasekaran's daughter)
E. R. Sahadevan as General Vikraman
 "Sattampillai" Venkatraman as Azhagesan (Jeeva's Cousin)
 Pakkirisamy as Alagalam (Azhagesan's friend)
 M. S. Draupadi as Vedha
 Master Gopal as Younger Villalan
 Baby Sasikala as Younger Jeeva
 K. K. Perumal
 M. N. Krishnan
 M. K. Durai Raj
K. K. Soundar as Parakraman
 S. S. Siva Sooriyan

Soundtrack 
Music was composed by Viswanathan–Ramamoorthy and lyrics were written by Thanjai N. Ramaiah Dass, A. Maruthakasi, Pattukkottai Kalyanasundaram and S. D. Sundharam. The song "Kaalamenum Kaattaaru" was taken from the stage play Kaviyin Kanavu authored by S. D. Sundaram.

References

External links 
 

1950s Tamil-language films
1958 films
Films scored by Viswanathan–Ramamoorthy
Indian black-and-white films
Indian historical films